Terrance Camilleri (born  7 November 1949) is a Maltese-born Australian actor who has performed actively in both the United Kingdom and United States. He is best recognized for portraying Emperor Napoleon I in the blockbuster comedy film Bill & Ted's Excellent Adventure (1989).

Biography
Camilleri was born in Malta, and made his feature film debut in Peter Weir's 1974 film The Cars That Ate Paris. He appeared in the 1983 sequel film Superman III. He also made a cameo appearance in Weir's The Truman Show.

Other appearances include as Special Branch police officer Hemmings in the science fiction film Incident at Raven's Gate.

In 2003, he appeared in the American film Hey DJ.

In 2006, as part of the World Cup campaign in Australia, Camilleri played the character of "History", an 800-year-old orc-like creature for the Nike "Stuff History" advertisements, which is part of Nike's soccer Joga Bonito adverts.

In 2009, Camilleri appeared as a cashier in the science fiction-thriller film Knowing.

In 2015, Camilleri co-starred in the family film Oddball.

Filmography

References

External links

1949 births
Australian male film actors
Australian male television actors
Maltese emigrants to Australia
Living people